James Samuel Gallagher was a member of the Wisconsin State Assembly in 1883 as well as a justice of the peace. He was a Democrat. Gallagher was born on May 21, 1845, in Braddock, Pennsylvania. He died on March 7, 1907, at his home in Gratiot, Wisconsin.

References

People from Braddock, Pennsylvania
People from Lafayette County, Wisconsin
American justices of the peace
1845 births
1907 deaths
Democratic Party members of the Wisconsin State Assembly